45 Andromedae, abbreviated 45 And, is a double star in the northern constellation Andromeda. 45 Andromedae is the Flamsteed designation. Its combined apparent visual magnitude is 5.80.

The stellar classification of 45 And is B7 III-IV, matching an evolving subgiant/giant star. It has about 5.2 times the Sun's radius and is radiating 414 times the Sun's luminosity from its photosphere at an effective temperature of 12,874 K.

This star is most likely single. A companion star was discovered by American astronomer George W. Hough in 1890. As of 2006, the companion was at an angular separation of  along a position angle of 225° from the primary.

References

External links
 Image 45 Andromedae

B-type giants
Double stars
Andromeda (constellation)
Durchmusterung objects
Andromedae, 45
007019
005550
0348